Neivamyrmex pilosus is a species of army ant in the family Formicidae.

Subspecies
 Neivamyrmex pilosus beebei (Wheeler, 1921)
 Neivamyrmex pilosus mandibularis (Smith, 1942)
 Neivamyrmex pilosus mexicanus (Smith, 1859)
 Neivamyrmex pilosus pilosus (Smith, 1858)

References

Further reading

 
 
 
 
 

Dorylinae
Insects described in 1858